The American Journal of Semiotics is a peer-reviewed academic journal covering semiotics. It was established in 1981 and is the official journal of the Semiotic Society of America. The journal publishes articles, responses or comments, and critical reviews. All volumes are available online from the Philosophy Documentation Center.

Abstracting and indexing 
The American Journal of Semiotics is abstracted and indexed in International Bibliography of Book Reviews of Scholarly Literature, International Bibliography of Periodical Literature, Linguistics and Language Behavior Abstracts, MLA International Bibliography, PhilPapers, and ProQuest databases.

See also 
 List of philosophy journals
 List of social science journals
 Semiotica
 Sign Systems Studies

External links

 Journals of semiotics in the world

English-language journals
Publications established in 1981
Semiotics journals
Quarterly journals
Philosophy Documentation Center academic journals